Erika Vollmer (née Obst; 23 February 1925 - 25 July 2021) was a German professional female tennis player who lost the final of Italian Championships singles title to British player Patricia Ward by 4–6, 3–6 in 1955.

She won the German national singles title in 1952, 1954, 1955, 1957 and 1959. Vollmer was the No.1 ranked German player in 1952 and 1955.

Between 1953 and 1959, she competed in seven consecutive editions of the Wimbledon Championships and achieved her best singles result in 1953 when she reached the quarterfinals, losing in two sets to first-seeded and eventual champion Maureen Connolly.

In 1947, she married doctor Johannes Vollmer. In 1956, she received the Silbernes Lorbeerblatt (Silver Laurel Leaf), the highest sports award in Germany. Vollmer died in the Summer of 2021.

Career finals

Singles: 1 (1 runner-up)

References

1925 births
2021 deaths
West German female tennis players
Sportspeople from Graz